Glen Campbell (1936–2017) was an American country musician.

Glen(n) Campbell may also refer to:

People 
 Glen Campbell (actor), (1964) Jamaican actor and comedian
 Glenn Ross Campbell (born 1946), American guitarist based in the UK
 Glenn Campbell (broadcaster) (born 1976), Scottish journalist
 Glen Campbell (curler) (1916–2005), Canadian curler
 Glenn Campbell (American football) (1904–1973), American football end

Other 
 Glen Campbell, Pennsylvania, town
 "Glen Campbell (Space Ghost Coast to Coast)", an episode of Space Ghost Coast to Coast
 Glen Travis Campbell (album), a 1972 album by Glen Campbell

See also 
 Campbell (surname)

Campbell, Glen